Toi is a given name of the following notable people:
 Toi Aukuso Cain (1959–2009), Samoan politician
 Toi Cook (born 1964), American football player
 Toi Derricotte (born 1941), American poet
 Toi Hutchinson (born 1973), American politician 
 Toi Inagawa (1940–2005), Japanese yakuza member
Toi Te Rito Maihi (born 1937), New Zealand weaver, printmaker, painter, educator and writer.
Sweet Tee (born Toi Jackson), American rapper